Kobeh Valley is a valley in the U.S. state of Nevada.

Kobeh is a name derived from the Shoshoni language meaning "face".

References

Valleys of Eureka County, Nevada